In a Different Light may refer to:

In a Different Light (Avalon album)
In a Different Light (Linda Davis album)
In a Different Light (Doug Stone album)
"In a Different Light" (song), this album's title track, originally found on Stone's self-titled debut album
In a Different Light (Everclear album)